Royal Noble Consort Suk of the Namyang Hong clan (Hangul: 숙빈 남양 홍씨, Hanja: 肅嬪 南陽 洪氏; 1418 – ?) was a concubine of King Munjong of Joseon.

Biography

Early life
The future Suk-bin was born in 1418, as the daughter of Hong Sim (홍심), the son of Hong Deok-bo (홍덕보), and Lady Yun of the Papyeong Yun clan (파평 윤씨).

The exact date of Lady Hong's birth is not clear, but in the Annals of the Joseon Dynasty it was mentioned that she was younger than Crown Princess Gwon.

She had one younger brother, Hong Eung, Internal Prince Ikseong (홍응 익성 부원군), who was a member of the State Council of Joseon.

Life as Royal Concubine
In 1431 (13th year of King Sejong's reign), when Munjong was still a Crown Prince, Lady Hong was officially chosen as his concubine along with Lady Gwon (posthumously honoured as Queen Hyeondeok), the eldest daughter of Gwon Jeon (권전), and Lady Jeong (later known as Royal Consort So-yong), the daughter of Jeong Gap-son (정갑손). Their fathers received rice and beans as a reward.

Because the three of them came from noble families, they were officially honoured as Seung-hwi (junior fourth rank concubine of the Crown Prince; 승휘, 承徽). On March 15, they entered the palace together. 

Despite Lady Hong being close with Munjong at the time when Crown Princess Bong was deposed, her father-in-law, King Sejong, chose Lady Gwon Yang-won (양원 권씨) to become the new Crown Princess, because she already gave birth to a daughter, Princess Gyeonghye, and held the higher rank. Munjong followed his father's wish.

Meanwhile, Lady Hong gave birth to a princess in 1441, but the daughter died at the age of 4, on December 4, 1444.

After Munjong ascended the throne, she was promoted to Gwi-in (junior first rank concubine of the King; 귀인, 貴人), and given the authority to become the leader the Inner Court since the Queen's seat was empty.

On August 7, 1452, a few months after Danjong succeeded his father, Lady Hong was honoured as Bin (senior first rank concubine of the King; 빈, 嬪), with the prefix Suk (肅), meaning "respectful".

She moved into Grand Prince Anpyeong’s house and stepped down from her position as leader of the Inner Court when her step-son married Queen Jeongsun.

Later life
There are no records left about the date of her death or where her tomb is located.

In 1466, her nephew, Hong Sang (홍상), married Princess Myeongsuk (명숙 공주), the daughter of Crown Prince Uigyeong and Queen Insu, and was known as Prince Consort Dangyang (당양위).

Family 
 Father: Hong Sim (홍심, 洪深) (1398 – 1456)
Grandfather: Hong Deok-bo (홍덕보, 洪德輔)
Grandmother: Lady Yi (이씨, 李氏); daughter of Yi Bal-saeng (이발생, 李發生)
 Mother: Lady Yun of the Paepyeong Yun clan (정부인 파평 윤씨, 貞夫人 坡平 尹氏)
Grandfather: Yun Gyu (윤규, 尹珪) (1365 – 1414)
Uncle: Yun Hui (윤희, 尹熺)
Aunt-in-law: Lady Shin of the Pyeongsan Shin clan (평산 신씨, 平山 申氏)
 Cousin: Royal Consort So-yong of the Paepyeong Yun clan (소용 윤씨)
Sibling(s)
 Younger brother: Hong Eung (홍응, 洪應) (1428 – 1492)
 Sister-in-law: Lady Yi of the Gyeongju Yi clan (경주 이씨, 慶州 李氏)
 Nephew: Hong Sang (홍상, 洪常) (1457 – 1513)
 Niece-in-law: Yi Gyeong-geun, Princess Myeongsuk (이경근 명숙공주, 李慶根 明淑公主) (1455/56 – 1482)
 Grandnephew: Hong Baek-gyeong (홍백경, 洪伯慶) (1471 – ?)
 Great-grandniece: Lady Hong of the Namyang Hong clan (남양 홍씨, 南陽 洪氏) 
 Great-grandnephew-in-law: Shin Hong-pil (신홍필, 愼弘弼)
 Younger brother: Hong Ching (홍칭, 洪偁)
Husband
 Yi Hyang, King Munjong (이향 문종, 문종 文宗)
 Unnamed princess (옹주) (1441 – 1444)

In popular culture
Portrayed by Park Young-Gwi in the 1994 KBS TV series Han Myung-hoe.
Portrayed by Jang Seo-hee in the 1998 KBS TV series The King and Queen.

References

External links
Lady Sukbin Hong on Encykorea .
Lady Sukbin Hong on Naver .

Joseon dynasty
Royal consorts of the Joseon dynasty
1418 births
Year of death unknown
Namyang Hong clan
15th-century Korean people
15th-century Korean women